The 2011 WPA World Nine-ball Junior Championships was the 20th hosting of the Junior World Championship in the pool discipline 9-Ball.  The event ran from  1–3 September 2011 in Kielce, Poland.

Tournament format 
All three competitions were first held in the double-elimination tournament with a single-elimination tournament from the quarter finals onwards. The events were all played under the winner-breaks format.

Boys event

Girls event

References

External links

2011 in cue sports
2011 in Russian sport
WPA World Nine-ball Junior Championship